Yongsoo Park is a Korean American writer who has authored the novels Boy Geniusand Las Cucarachas, the essay collection  The Art of Eating Bitter: A Hausfrau Dad's Journey with Kids, and the memoir Rated R Boy: Growing Up Korean in 1980s Queens.

Critical reception
Kathleen Alcala, while being interviewed about magical realism for Margin, described Boy Genius as being among "the most subversive magical realism".

References

External links
 
 "How to Be an Asian American Writer" in Otis Nebula
 "Chinese Poem" and "4-2-9" in The Elevation Review
 "Refugee Cheap" in Korean American Story
 "Camp Star Lake" in Asian American Writing
 "Train to Evanston" in Sleet Magazine
 "The Awning" in Quarterly Literary Review Singapore
 "Initiation" in Better Than Starbucks Magazine
 "A Modern Time Machine" in Critical Read Art Is Essential
 "Model Minority" in The Anti-Languorous Project
  "Birthday Trees" in Sidereal Magazine

21st-century American novelists
American male novelists
American writers of Korean descent
American novelists of Asian descent
21st-century American male writers
Korean-American literature